The Floyd Rose Locking Tremolo, or simply Floyd Rose, is a type of locking vibrato arm for a guitar. Floyd D. Rose invented the locking vibrato in 1976, the first of its kind, and it is now manufactured by a company of the same name. The Floyd Rose gained popularity in the 1980s through guitarists like Eddie Van Halen, Neal Schon, Brad Gillis, Joe Satriani, Steve Vai, and Alex Lifeson, who used its ability to stay in tune even with extreme changes in pitch. Its tuning stability comes through the double-locking design that has been widely regarded as revolutionary; the design has been listed on Guitar Worlds "10 Most Earth Shaking Guitar Innovations" and Guitar Players "101 Greatest Moments in Guitar History 1979–1983."

History

Floyd D. Rose first started working on what became the Floyd Rose Tremolo in 1976. He was playing in a rock band at the time, inspired by Jimi Hendrix and Deep Purple. He frequently used the vibrato bar but could not make his guitars stay in tune using traditional approaches like lubricating the nut, or winding the strings as little as possible around the tuning pegs.

At the time, Rose made and sold jewelry, and so had the skills and tools to fabricate small metal parts. After noticing the strings moved freely with the regular nut design, he made a brass nut that locked the strings in place with three U-shaped clamps. He installed this nut in his 1957 Fender Stratocaster. Later he improved this design by using hardened steel—otherwise the strings wore the clamps down too quickly—and redesigned the bridge, which also locked the strings with clamps.

Rose hand-made the first bridges and nuts, which were quickly picked up by some influential guitarists at the time, such as Eddie Van Halen. Other well-known guitarists who picked it up early were Neal Schon, who purportedly got serial number 3, Brad Gillis (serial number 4), and Steve Vai.

The first patent was awarded in 1979, and shortly afterward, Rose made an agreement with Kramer Guitars because he could no longer keep up with demand manufacturing the bridges by hand. Kramer's guitar models with the Floyd Rose bridge became very popular, leading them to drop the earlier Rockinger vibrato in favor of the Floyd Rose between June 1982 and January 1983. The Floyd Rose design's popularity led to other companies making similar bridges, thus violating the patent. Notably, courts found that the Kahler Tremolo System infringed on Floyd Rose's patents, and awarded a judgment in excess of $100 million against Gary Kahler.

Floyd Rose and Kramer went on to make licensing agreements with other manufacturers, and there are now several different models available based on the double-locking design. Because the bridges and nuts were no longer hand-made it was necessary to update the design, and the bridges were changed to add a set of tuners that allow for fine-tuning the guitar after the strings are locked at the nut.

In January 1991, Kramer's exclusive distribution agreement with Rose ended when Fender announced they would be the new exclusive distributor of Floyd Rose products. While Fender used Floyd Rose-licensed vibrato systems previously, this move allowed Fender to offer a few models with the original Floyd Rose Tremolo, such as the Richie Sambora Signature Strat in 1991, the Floyd Rose Classic Stratocaster in 1992 and the Set-Neck Floyd Rose Strat in 1993. Floyd Rose collaborated with Fender to design a Fender Deluxe Locking Tremolo, introduced in 1991 on the Strat Plus Deluxe, the USA Contemporary Stratocaster, and the Strat Ultra. Fender used the Floyd Rose-designed locking vibrato system on certain humbucker-equipped American Deluxe and Showmaster models until 2007.

In 2005, distribution of the Floyd Rose Original reverted to Floyd Rose, whereas the patented designs were licensed to other manufacturers to use.

Principles

Position I illustrates the normal position of an ideally tuned Floyd Rose bridge. The bridge (orange in the diagram) balances on a pivot point, being pulled counter-clockwise by the strings' tension and clockwise by typically one to five springs. Controlled by special tuning screws (purple in the diagram), these two forces are balanced such that the bridge's surface is parallel to the guitar body (olive in the diagram). The strings are locked tightly with a special mechanism at the nut (green in the diagram) as well as at the bridge (turquoise in the diagram), hence "double-locking".

Position II illustrates the position of the bridge when the vibrato arm is pushed down towards the guitar body. The bridge rotates around a pivot point counter-clockwise and the tension in each string decreases, lowering the pitch of each string. The sound of any notes being played becomes flat. While the tension of the strings decreases, the tension of the springs increases. It is the balance between string-tension and spring-tension, as well as the fact that the strings end at the bridge saddles and nut (eliminating "play" in the string, which would negatively affect tuning), that brings the strings reliably back into tune when force on the bar is removed.

Position III illustrates the position of the bridge when the vibrato arm is pulled up away from the guitar body. The bridge rotates clockwise, tension in the strings increases, the pitch of the sound increases and so notes sound sharper than normal. Due to the limitations on the assembly's movement imposed by the guitar's body, the amount of available pitch change is much larger when the bar is depressed than when it is lifted.

Note that when using the vibrato bar, string action (the distance between the strings and the fretboard) is affected, and this can sometimes cause the strings to unintentionally touch the frets and create unwanted sounds on instruments set up with extremely low action and heavily recessed vibrato installations.

Advantages and disadvantages

The main advantage of the Floyd Rose vibrato system is its double-locking design. This makes the guitar stay in tune through large pitch changes, e.g., forcing the vibrato bar all the way down to the guitar body, or pulling up on the bar to raise the tone by as much as a fifth or a seventh.

A typical bridge set-up has it "float"—so the player can both raise and lower the pitch with the vibrato bar. However, if a string breaks, the balance of tensions on the bridge is disrupted, leaving the bridge out of position and therefore the guitar out of tune. Moreover, since the tension of one string affects the tension of all the others, it can take several iterations through the tuning process before the instrument is tuned.

Some players, including Eddie Van Halen, prefer to instead have a "half-floating" bridge, which allows only downwards motion. This means the cavity of the tremolo pocket is not fully milled away underneath—and if the tension of the rear springs is slightly stronger than the tension of the strings, the tremolo always rests flush with the body. In this set-up, a broken string has no effect on the pitch of the other strings, as the reduced overall string tension from the broken string doesn't make the bridge move, since it already presses against the body of the guitar. This also allows fitting a device to the bridge that can drop the low E-string down to D to extend the tonal variety of the guitar, even during live performance.
Bending, however, still affects the rest of the strings, which makes some double-stop techniques more difficult to achieve.

The bridge's effect on the tone of the guitar is a topic of much disagreement. Some players find that the Floyd Rose bridge has a "thin" tone, which has led to the development of replacement sustain blocks. These blocks are generally larger in size than the standard block and may be constructed from a similar brass alloy or an alternative like titanium or copper. According to reviews this modification might lead to a preferable change in the tonal quality of the guitar.

Models and varieties

 Floyd Rose Original is the oldest model still in production. Since 1977, production models bearing this name are mostly the same as the first model, with only minor changes. Note that the name "Floyd Rose Original" is used to differentiate this system from "Floyd Rose Licensed". The first Original Floyds were double locking, but had no fine tuners, so players had to unclamp the nut every time they retuned the guitar.
 Floyd Rose II is a lower end version of the Original Floyd used mostly on import and mid-range instruments. Originally, Floyd IIs were single locking, locking only at the nut. Later versions were made double locking, but used weaker materials than the Original Floyd Rose, making them less dependable.
 Floyd Rose Pro is a low-profile version of Floyd Rose Original. The bridge and arm design is changed in such a way that the guitarist's hand is generally closer to the strings while holding the vibrato arm. The bridge has a narrower string spacing (0.400 inches or 10.16 mm in this design versus 0.420 inches or 10.66 mm of the Floyd Rose Original).
 Floyd Rose SpeedLoader Tremolo is a redesign developed in 1995–1999 and introduced around 2003 that combines Floyd Rose Original with the SpeedLoader system, and requires special strings and is manufactured under license of McCabe US Patents for "macrotuners", ie. full-range tuners.
 Floyd Rose 1000 and Floyd Rose Special are made with the same design as the Original but manufactured in South Korea. The Floyd Rose 1000 is built with the same materials as the Original, however the Floyd Rose Special utilizes substitute materials such as zinc alloy saddles instead of steel and a zinc alloy sustain block instead of brass which significantly decreases the cost of the Special model.
 Fender Deluxe Locking Tremolo. A specially designed system that was made by Fender Musical Instruments Corporation in 1991 in conjunction with Floyd Rose, utilizing locking tuners, a modified Fender 2-point synchronized vibrato with locking bridge saddles and a special low-friction LSR Roller Nut that lets strings slide during vibrato use. This is a double locking system, except the other locking point is at the tuner instead of nut.

Floyd Rose Licensed Models

Previously, all similar double locking vibrato systems were produced under license from Floyd Rose, and marketed as such, but in 2003 the relevant patents expired.

 Yamaha Finger Clamp is a variety of Floyd Rose that have built-in levers, and thus when tuning, no allen keys are needed. Available on the RGX520DZ, RGX620DZ and CV820 Wes Borland signature model.
 Vigier Floyd Rose created by Vigier guitars at the beginning of the '90s, this system uses force-tolerant needle bearings for improved wear on the bridge and enhanced tuning stability.  The ball-bearing and global tuner features are manufactured under license to American Inventor and recording artist, Geoffrey Lee McCabe—see U.S. Patent Nos. 6,175,066 5,965,831, 6,891,094, 5,986,191, 6,563,034 and 7,470,841.
 Kahler 2700 Series (Killer, Steeler, and Spyder) made in the late 80's by Kahler, designed by David Petschulat, this system used a knife-edge fulcrum bridge (unlike the typical Kahler cam system).  The string locks at the bridge were embossed FLOYD ROSE LIC.
 Ibanez Edge is Ibanez's Floyd Rose variant. There are 4 primary versions: Edge, LoPro Edge, EdgePro, and EdgeZero with numbered variants denoting budget models of the main lines, and also "Double" variants of many of these, the moniker denoting the inclusion of Piezo pickups. The Edge and LoPro Edge were discontinued in 2003 but were subsequently reintroduced on the signature models of Steve Vai and Joe Satriani. (Some special edition guitars used these trems prior to their reintroduction; however, the vibratos used were new old stock (NOS), rather than production runs.) These two vibratos, whether old or new, bear a mark of Floyd Rose Licensing, as they are produced using the same tooling, by Japanese guitar parts manufacturer Gotoh.
 Ibanez Zero Resistance uses a ball-bearing mechanic instead of knife-edge as the joint, and a stop-bar to help the guitar stay in tune after diving the vibrato. Ibanez claims this system improves tuning stability after breaking a string. These springs, including their orientation, are referred to as the ZPS system, with variants numbered 1 to 3, and are also present as part of the EdgeZero design. The ball-bearing and global tuner features are manufactured under license to American Inventor and recording artist, Geoffrey Lee McCabe—see U.S. Patent Nos. 6,175,066 5,965,831, 6,891,094, 5,986,191, 6,563,034 and 7,470,841.
 Ibanez Fixed Edge''', while it still uses the locking nut and locking bridge, was mounted on top of the body, and was used not as a vibrato system, but to provide a familiar feel to vibrato users, and even more tuning stability on a hardtailed guitar.

Popular use

The Floyd Rose Tremolo rose to popularity in the early 1980s. Many popular artists quickly adopted the device, making it difficult to measure how much each individual artist contributed to that popularity. Most sources consider Eddie Van Halen a pioneer of Floyd Rose usage. Other players frequently cited as influential Floyd Rose users are Steve Vai, Joe Satriani, Kirk Hammett, Brad Gillis, Tom Morello, Allan Holdsworth, Dimebag Darrell and Synyster Gates.

References

Patents

Floyd Rose holds a number of patents on floating bridge design:

  — bridge mechanism patent;

  — first fine tuners and saddle patent;

  — second fine tuners and saddle patent;

  — spring and claw mechanism;

  — early patent for a tremstopper device;

  — patent for Floyd Rose Pro, low-profile version;

External links
 Floyd Rose website
Floyd Rose Interview for NAMM Oral History Program

Guitar bridges
1977 musical instruments